Annesley Black (born 8 September 1979 in Ottawa, Ontario) is a Canadian composer.

Career 
After studying jazz and electronic music at Concordia University in Montreal Annesley Black received her bachelor's degree in musical composition in 2004 from McGill University in Montreal under Brian Cherney. She studied composition 2004–2006 with York Höller and Hans-Ulrich Humpert at the Hochschule für Musik Köln. She completed her studies in composition with Mathias Spahlinger, electronic music with Orm Finnendahl and applied music with Cornelius Schwehr at the Hochschule für Musik Freiburg (Diplom Dec. 2008). 
Among her many awards and distinctions are a scholarship and award from the Darmstadt International Summer Courses for New Music (2004/2006), the Busoni Composition Prize (Förderpreis) of the Academy of Arts, Berlin (2008) and the Stuttgart Composition Prize (2009). She was also a fellow at the Berlin Academy of Arts in 2009.
Her pieces have been performed in Germany, Canada and other countries by various ensembles including Ensemble Modern, Ensemble ascolta, ensemble mosaik, Ensemble SurPlus, Nouvel Ensemble Moderne, Tsilumos Ensemble, ensemble contemporain de Montréal, Quintett Boréale, Composers Slide Quartet and hr-Sinfonieorchester in such festivals as Warsaw Autumn, Ultraschall Festival Berlin, Darmstadt Summer Courses, ECLAT Festival Stuttgart, Donaueschingen Festival, Wittener Tage für neue Kammermusik, SALT New Music Festival in Victoria, British Columbia, Ottawa Chamber Music Festival. 
Her music theatre Solopoly for five percussionists was premiered at the National Theatre Mannheim in May 2015. 
Since 2008 Annesley Black has performed as a Sound Engineer Assistant for the SWR 
Experimental Studio for recordings and concerts. Annesley Black lives in Frankfurt am Main/Germany where she teaches at Dr. Hoch's Konservatorium (electronic media/electronic composition). Since 2018 Black has been a member of the Academy of Arts, Berlin.

Works

Solo music
 maiko for solo viola (2006)
 aorko for solo viola and three loudspeakers (2006/09)
 4238 De Bullion for Piano with live processing of video and sound (2007/08)
 scissors for trombone (2008)
 a piece that is a size that is recognised as not a size but a piece for piano (2013)
 stiff upper lip for bass clarinet (2014)

Chamber music
 FIGHT for flute, oboe, clarinet, bassoon and horn (2002/03)
 Folds Dependent for string quartet (2003)
 Miniature for saxophone quartet (2005)
 LAUF for flute, oboe, clarinet, percussion, piano, violin, viola, violoncello and double bass (2005)
 Rock Paper Scissors for bass clarinet, trombone and double bass (2006)
 Smooche de la Rooche II for 3 athletically inclined percussionists and prepared electronics (2007)
 Anstalt. Musik zum Film "Kino Eye" Dziga Vertov (Kapitel 6) [Music to the film "Kino Eye Dziga Vertov (chapter 6)] for chamber ensemble (oboe, clarinet, horn, piano, percussion, violin, violoncello, double bass) (2007)
 Humans in Motion for trumpet, trombone, guitar/banjo, piano, 2 percussionists and violoncello (2007/08)
 Moment – performatives Spazieren. Musik zum Film von Yukihiro Taguchi for violin, percussion and piano (2009)
 tender pink descender for 2 contrabass clarinets (2009)
 Industrial Drive for trombone quartet (2010)
 Moment – Curitiba – Vorspiel for flugelhorn, euphonium, piano, 2 percussionists, guitar and violoncello (2010)
 Earle Brown's Forgotten Piece in Moholy-Nagy's Light-Space-Modulator for piano and live-sequenced sounds and video (2012)
 Jenny's last Rock for flute, oboe, clarinet, saxophone, percussion, piano, violin, viola, violoncello and tape (2012/13)
 GURU GURU – Doppelrequiem für Karlheinz Stockhausen und Steve Jobs for trumpet, trombone, 2 percussionists, piano/sampler, electric guitar, violoncello and live electronics (collaborative composition with Robin Hoffmann) (2013)
 ROOMS for tenor saxophone, piano/toy piano, guitar, viola and live electronics (2015)

Ensemble / Orchestra
 Snow Job for ensemble (flute, oboe, clarinet, saxophone, percussion, piano, violin, viola, violoncello), light sequencer (2010)
 misinterpreting the 2008 south sudanese budget reform for the orchestra for orchestra (4 fl, 3 ob, 3 cl, 3 bn, 4 hn, 3 tr, 3 trb, timp, 3 perc, 2 hp, strings: 14-12-10-8-6) (2012)

Stage works
 Flowers of Carnage – a Kung-Fu performance for musicians (professionals or non-professionals), performers, electronics/live electronics (2013/14)
 Solopoly for five percussionists (2015)

Electronic music
 Don't spray snow on the other person's grave sound installation for 16 loudspeakers (2009/10)
 pull the plug – Las Vegas and Venice, a comparative study sound and video installation with Sophie Narr (2009/10)

Discography
 Annesley Black: NO USE IN A CENTRE: Humans in Motion / aorko / tender pink descender / Smooche de la Rooche II / misinterpreting the 2008 south sudanese budget reform for the orchestra WERGO 2013 (WER 6590 2)

References

External links
 
 Annesley Black at Myspace
 Publisher's website: Annesley Black at Edition Juliane Klein biography, work list, photos, calendar of events
 Annesley Black at “Abenteuer Neue Musik / musicacademy” (with information, scores, videos about Smooche de la Rooche II and Flowers of Carnage) (in German)
 Film portrait of Annesley Black (in German, with subtitles in English) published by Deutscher Musikrat

1979 births
Living people
Musicians from Ottawa
Canadian classical composers
21st-century classical composers
Women classical composers
McGill University School of Music alumni
Hochschule für Musik Freiburg alumni
Ernst von Siemens Composers' Prize winners
21st-century women composers
Canadian women composers